Ksenia Lykina and Akiko Omae were the defending champions, but Omae chose not to participate. 

Lykina partnered alongside Junri Namigata, and successfully defended her title, defeating Nicha Lertpitaksinchai and Peangtarn Plipuech in the final, 3–6, 6–3, [10–4].

Seeds

Draw

References
Main Draw

Dunlop World Challenge - Doubles
Dunlop World Challenge